Oxycanus serratus is a moth of the family Hepialidae. It is found in New Guinea.

References

Moths described in 1955
Hepialidae